Access 5 was a national project run by NASA in collaboration with industry, the Federal Aviation Administration (FAA), and the United States Department of Defense (DoD), in order to introduce high altitude, long endurance (HALE) remotely operated aircraft (ROA) for routine flights in the National Airspace System (NAS). Access 5 commenced in May 2004 and was slated to run for five years. The project received initial funding from NASA and guarantees of support from the ROA industry. It was managed out of Dryden Flight Research Center.

The goal of Access 5 was to enable what government and industry leaders believe will ultimately be a robust civil and commercial market for HALE ROA. The current lack of ready access to the NAS inhibits investment in ROA commercialization and the ability of users to obtain cost-effective ROA services. Access 5 seeks to remove the barriers to aviation's most compelling new offering in decades.

The project was terminated on February 28, 2006 after a reorganization of NASA's research program. The cancellation of the program led members of the UAV National Industry Team (UNITE) alliance, which includes Boeing, General Atomics, Lockheed Martin, Northrop Grumman, AeroVironment, and Aurora Flight Sciences to advocate for a new national plan in testimony before the United States Congress.

References

External links 
 

NASA programs